Dort is a surname. Notable people with the surname include:

 Filip Dort (born 1980), Czech footballer
 Josiah Dallas Dort (1861–1925), American carriage and automobile manufacturer
 Luguentz Dort (born 1999), Canadian basketball player

See also
 Dorr (surname)
 Van Dort, surname